Kurt Oatway  (born 23 February 1984) is a sit-skier representing Canada at the 2018 Winter Paralympics. His disability is due to an injury in 2007. He won gold at the 2018 Winter Paralympics in men's sitting Super G at the Pyeongchang Olympics. He also won silver medals at the 2019 World Para Alpine Skiing Championships in both the Downhill and Super-G events.

He has an interest in geology.

References

External links 
 
 

1984 births
Living people
Alpine skiers at the 2014 Winter Paralympics
Alpine skiers at the 2018 Winter Paralympics
Medalists at the 2018 Winter Paralympics
Paralympic alpine skiers of Canada
Paralympic gold medalists for Canada
Canadian male alpine skiers
Paralympic medalists in alpine skiing